Born to Be Mild may refer to:

 Born to Be Mild (album), an album of the band Snog
 "Born to Be Mild", an episode of the TV show Family Matters
 "Born to Be Mild", an 2 episodes of the TV show Kirby: Right Back at Ya!
 "Born to Be Mild", an episode of the TV show Squirrel Boy
 "Born to Be Mild", an episode of the TV show Thirtysomething

Other uses 
 Man, the Myth, the Tax Bill (aka Born to Be Mild), a first leg of Robbie Williams North American Tours

See also 
 Born to Be Wild (disambiguation)